Astronomy Reports (Russian: Астрономический журнал, Astronomicheskii Zhurnal), is a Russian, monthly, peer reviewed, scientific journal. This journal tends to focus its publishing efforts on original research regarding astronomical topics. Other types of reporting are also included such as chronicles, proceedings of international conferences, and book reviews. Founded in 1924, it is described as the most prominent astronomy journal during the age of the Soviet Union. Originally a print version, it is also available online. The editor-in-chief was Alexander A. Boyarchuk, Institute of Astronomy of the Russian Academy of Sciences, Moscow, Russia.

Former title
This journal, currently titled "Astronomy Reports", continues with the same Russian title as  when it was known in English  as  Soviet Astronomy. The former Soviet Astronomy shares exactly the same Russian name as this journal, exactly the same print issn, but the US Library of Congress lists this under a different and unique number in its catalog. Soviet Astronomy ceased publication with volume 36, no. 6 which was published in 1992.

Translation and distribution
Astronomicheskii Zhurnal is translated into English by the International Academic Publishing Company Nauka/Interperiodica (MAIK Nauka/Interperiodica), which is also the official publisher. However, beginning in 2006 access and distribution outside of Russia is through Springer. In addition, the English version of the journal is published simultaneously with its Russian version under the title "Astronomicheskii Zhurnal". From 1999, until present day it has produced 12 issues per year. However, prior to this only six issues were published each year, back to 1996.

Scope
The field of interest for this journal, Astronomy, includes in its scope sub-topics of astronomy. These are stellar astronomy, celestial mechanics, radio astronomy, physics of the Sun, planetary astrophysics, astrophysics theory, and astrophysics science through observation. Also included are methods of astronomy and instrumentation.

Abstracting and indexing
Astronomy Reports is indexed in the following databases:
Academic OneFile
Academic Search
Astrophysics Data System (ADS)
Chemical Abstracts Service (CAS)
Current Abstracts
Current Contents/Physical
Chemical and Earth Sciences
Digital Mathematics Registry
Gale
Google Scholar
Inspec
Journal Citation Reports/Science Edition
OCLC
PASCAL
Science & Technology Collection
Science Citation Index
Science Citation Index Expanded (SciSearch)
SCOPUS
Simbad Astronomical Database
Summon by Serial Solutions
TOC Premier

See also
Astronomy Letters

References

External links

Astronomy journals
English-language journals
Publications established in 1924
Astronomy in Russia
Springer Science+Business Media academic journals
Nauka academic journals
Monthly journals
Astronomy in the Soviet Union